Villaamil (or Villamil) is a Spanish surname. Notable people with the surname include:

Fernando Villaamil (1845–1898), Spanish naval officer
Jenaro Pérez Villaamil (1807–1854), Spanish painter
José María Díaz y Díaz Villaamil
Polo Villaamil (born 1979), Spanish racing driver

Spanish-language surnames